The 1911 Alabama Crimson Tide football team (variously "Alabama", "UA" or "Bama") represented the University of Alabama in the 1911 college football season. It was the Crimson Tide's 19th overall and 16th season as a member of the Southern Intercollegiate Athletic Association (SIAA). The team was led by head coach D. V. Graves, in his first year, and played their home games at the University of Alabama Quad in Tuscaloosa and the Birmingham Fairgrounds in Birmingham, Alabama. They finished the season with a record of five wins, two losses and two ties (5–2–2 overall, 2–2–2 in the SIAA).

In June 1911, Guy Lowman resigned from his position of head coach and athletic director at Alabama, and one month later the hiring of Graves to serve in both capacities was announced by the university president. They were then upset by Georgia at Birmingham before playing both Mississippi A&M and Georgia Tech to ties on the road.

Before the season 
On June 21, 1911, Kansas State Agricultural College (now known as Kansas State University) announced Alabama head coach and athletic director Guy Lowman had been hired to serve in the same capacities at Kansas State. After a month-long search, on July 21, university president John Abercrombie offered the job of professor of physical training and athletic director to D. V. Graves to which he accepted immediately via telegraph. The appointment was inclusive of him serving as head coach of all athletic teams at Alabama, including football. Graves was selected as he was the most highly recommended candidate, and he also played baseball for a single-season under Lowman while in college at the University of Missouri.

Schedule

Game summaries

Howard 

Sources:

Alabama opened the season with a 24–0 shutout victory over Howard (now Samford University) at Tuscaloosa. After a scoreless first quarter, the Crimson Tide took a 6–0 lead into halftime after Farley Moody scored on a 40-yard punt return for a touchdown. After a scoreless third, Alabama then closed the game with a trio of fourth quarter touchdowns. 	
Robert Bumgardner scored first on a five-yard run, Moody on a one-yard run and Charlie Joplin on a 65-yard reception.

The victory brought Alabama's all-time record against Howard to 4–0.

The starting lineup was Hargrove Vandegraaff (left end), Harold Mustin Powell (left tackle), Phillip Brooks Keller (left guard), Henry Barnett (center), Julius Clorefeline (right guard), C. C. Countess (right tackle), W. S. Pritchard (right end), Farley Moody (quarterback), Robert Bumgardner (left halfback), Edward Judson Finnell (right halfback), Adrian Vandegraaff (fullback).

Birmingham College 

Sources:

In their second game of the season, Alabama defeated Birmingham College (now Birmingham–Southern College) 47–5 at The Quad. Adrian Vandegraaff gave Alabama an early 6–0 lead behind his short touchdown run within the first three minutes of the game. Birmingham responded with their only points of the day on the drive that ensued on a short Taylor run and made the score 6–5. In the second, Alabama extended their lead to 17–5 behind a short touchdown run by Vandegraaff and a 30-yard run by Robert Bumgardner.

After Farley Moody scored on a short touchdown run early in the third, Alabama closed the game with four touchdowns in the fourth quarter. Hargrove Van de Graaff scored first after he blocked a Birmingham punt and returned it 22-yards for the score. Adrian Van de Graaff next scored on an 85-yard kickoff return followed by a fourth Adrian Vandegraaff touchdown run and a 70-yard C. W. Greer run that made the final score 47–5. The victory brought Alabama's all-time record against Birmingham College to 2–0.

The starting lineup was Robert Bumgardner (left end), Harold Mustin Powell (left tackle), Phillip Brooks Keller (left guard), Henry Barnett (center), Julius Clorefeline (right guard), C. C. Countess (right tackle), W. S. Pritchard (right end), Farley Moody (quarterback), Hargrove Vandegraaff (left halfback), Edward Judson Finnell (right halfback), Adrian Vandegraaff (fullback).

Georgia 

Sources:

In what was their first Birmingham game of the season, the Crimsons lost to Georgia 11–3 at the Fairgrounds. Bob McWhorter scored the first Georgia points of the game after he recovered a punt fumbled by Farley Moody and returned it for a touchdown and 5–0 lead. Farley then cut the Bulldog lead to 5–3 at halftime behind his 35-yard drop kick field goal in the second quarter. McWhorter then made the final score 11–3 behind his 12-yard touchdown run late in the fourth quarter. The loss brought Alabama's all-time record against Georgia to 3–4–3.

The starting lineup was: Hargrove Vandergraaf (left end), Harold Mustin Powell (left tackle), Phillip Brooks Keller (left guard), Henry Barnett (center), Julius Clorefeline (right guard), C. C. Countess (right tackle), William L. Harsh (right end), Farley Moody (quarterback), Courtney (left halfback), Holt Andrews McDowell (right halfback), Adrian Vandegraaff (fullback).

Mississippi A&M 

Sources:

In their first road game of the season, the Alabama played the Mississippi A&M Aggies to a 6–6 tie before 3,000 fans at the Fairgrounds in Columbus, Mississippi. After a scoreless first, the Aggies took a 6–0 lead behind a four-yard Morley Jennings touchdown run. Alabama responded with their lone points after Adrian Vandegraaff returned a Mississippi fumble 25-yard and tied the game 6–6. The tie brought Alabama's all-time record against Mississippi A&M to 6–1–1.

The starting lineup was: Hargrove Vandergraaf (left end), Harold Mustin Powell (left tackle), Phillip Brooks Keller (left guard), Henry Barnett (center), Julius Clorefeline (right guard), J. W. Hicks (right tackle), Robert Bumgardner (right end), Farley Moody (quarterback), Holt Andrews McDowell (left halfback), Edward Judson Finnell (right halfback), Adrian Vandegraaff (fullback).

Georgia Tech 

Sources:

The Georgia Tech game ended in a scoreless tie after time expired as Alabama drove to the Tech three-yard line. Following a hard-fought scoreless tie with Georgia Tech in 1911, coach John Heisman declared that he had never seen a player "so thoroughly imbued with the true spirit of football as Hargrove Vandegraaff." The tie brought Alabama's all-time record against Georgia Tech to 1–3–1.

The starting lineup was: Hargrove Vandergraaf (left end), Harold Mustin Powell (left tackle), Phillip Brooks Keller (left guard), Henry Barnett (center), Julius Clorefeline (right guard), C. C. Countess (right tackle), Robert Bumgardner (right end), Farley Moody (quarterback), Holt Andrews McDowell (left halfback), Edward Judson Finnell (right halfback), Adrian Vandegraaff (fullback).

Marion Military Institute 
In what was their third consecutive road game, Alabama shutout the Marion Military Institute 35–0. In what was also the only game played by Alabama at Marion, the win improved Alabama's all-time record against Marion to 3–0.

Tulane 

Sources:

In what was their final Tuscaloosa game of the season, Alabama shutout Tulane 22–0 at The Quad. After a scoreless first, Alabama took a 5–0 lead in the second quarter on a 40-yard Farley Moody punt return. The score remained the same through the fourth quarter when Alabama scored a trio of touchdowns for the 22–0 victory. Touchdowns were scored on short runs by both Adrian and Hargrove Vandergraaf as well as on a 25-yard Robert Bumgardner run. The win improved Alabama's all-time record against Tulane to 4–2–1.

The starting lineup was: Hargrove Vandergraaf (left end), Harold Mustin Powell (left tackle), Phillip Brooks Keller (left guard), Henry Barnett (center),  Julius Clorefeline (right guard), C. C. Countess (right tackle), Robert Bumgardner (right end), Farley Moody (quarterback), Holt Andrews McDowell (left halfback), William L. Harsh (right halfback), Adrian Vandegraaff (fullback).

Sewanee 

Sources:

In extremely muddy conditions at Birmingham, Alabama was upset by Sewanee 3–0 at the Fairgrounds. The game remained scoreless through the final minutes of the game when Jenks Gillem connected on a 15-yard drop kick field goal that gave the Tigers the 3–0 victory. The loss brought Alabama's all-time record against Sewanee to 1–7.

The starting lineup was: Hargrove Vandergraaf (left end), Harold Mustin Powell (left tackle), Phillip Brooks Keller (left guard), Henry Barnett (center), Julius Clorefeline (right guard), C. C. Countess (right tackle), Robert Bumgardner (right end), Farley Moody (quarterback), Holt Andrews McDowell (left halfback),  William L. Harsh (right halfback), Adrian Vandegraaff (fullback).

Davidson 

Source:

In their only all-time meeting against , Alabama Alabama rallied with a pair of late touchdowns and defeated the Wildcats 16–6 at the Birmingham Fairgrounds in their season finale. After a scoreless first quarter, Alabama took a 5–0 lead behind a long Adrian Vandegraaff touchdown reception from Farley Moody on a fake punt. Davidson responded on the drive that ensued and took a 6–5 lead behind a 55-yard Q. D. Williford interception return for a touchdown.

The Wildcats retained the lead through the fourth quarter when Alabama won the game behind a pair of late touchdowns. Adrian Vandegraaff scored first on a 27-yard touchdown run and was followed with a second touchdown run from Vandegraaff  that made the final score 16–6.

The starting lineup was: Hargrove Vandergraaf (left end), Harold Mustin Powell (left tackle), Phillip Brooks Keller (left guard), Henry Barnett (center), J. W. Hicks (right guard), C. C. Countess (right tackle), Robert Bumgardner (right end), Farley Moody (quarterback), Holt Andrews McDowell (left halfback),  William L. Harsh (right halfback), Adrian Vandegraaff (fullback).

Roster

Notes

References 
General

 
 

Specific

Alabama
Alabama Crimson Tide football seasons
Alabama Crimson Tide football